Neochori Falaisias is a mountain village in the municipal unit of Falaisia, Arcadia, Greece. It is situated in the northern part of the Taygetus mountains, at about 1200 m elevation. It is 3 km east of Dyrrachio, 4 km west of Georgitsi, 17 km southeast of Leontari and 26 km southeast of Megalopoli. In 2011 Neochori had a population of 59. It suffered damage from the 2007 Greek forest fires.

Population

See also
List of settlements in Arcadia

References

External links
History and Information about Neochori
 Neochori on the GTP Travel Pages

Falaisia
Populated places in Arcadia, Peloponnese